The Yuna River (Spanish: Río Yuna) is the second longest river in the Dominican Republic at  in length. It forms within the Cordillera Central mountain range southwest of the city of Bonao in Monseñor Nouel Province, and passes through the fertile Cibao Valley. The river from there turns north-northeast passing the city of Bonao along the way. Southwest of Cotuí, the river reaches Hatillo Dam (Spanish: Presa de Hatillo) before turning northeast then east as it reaches its mouth at the Samaná Bay in the northeast part of the Dominican Republic. Like many rivers in the Dominican Republic, the name is derived from the Taíno language.

Course
The Cerro Montoso Hill lies along the highest mountain range in the West Indies, the Cordillera Central. The Cordillera Central provides the principal watershed and drainage divide for the Dominican Republic; the Yuna has its source along the northern slope of the mountain range. The Yuna descends from its headwaters running south then west where several streams feed into the river near the San José de Ocoa province border. The Yuna then turns north near the village of El Torito passing through several mountains including Torito Hill (Spanish: La Loma del Torito), and Middle Hill (Spanish: La Loma El Medio). The Yuna shifts north-northwest near the Middle Hill passing through several villages including Pino de Yuna, Piedra de los Veganos, and El Capa.

The Yuna next flows into the village of Los Finitos where it travels in a more northerly course. The river then receives two tributaries along its left bank: the Blanco and Tireo River. The Yuna then heads northeast into lower elevations as the river leaves the Cordillera Central. The river passes through the village of Los Quemados, receiving several forks that originate within the Cordillera Central to the west. The river next bypasses Bonao to the northwest of the city. The Yuna then flows into the town of Los Arroces, receiving a major tributary, the Masopedro River, on the left bank. The Yuna then heads east passing under the Autopista Duarte before entering another mountainous region of Monseñor Nouel. The Yuna next passes north of Falconbridge Ltd., a major economic income for the Bonao area. The Yuna heads east as it cuts through several mountains in this region including the Flat Hill (Spanish: La Loma del Llano) where the Yujo River converges onto the Yuna. The river accompanies the Sánchez Ramírez Province line east of Flat Hill and enters the province upon arriving at Lake Hatillo (Spanish: Presa de Hatillo) in the municipality of Cotuí where it joins the Maimón River.

The reservoir, surrounded by rolling hills, is the largest artificial lake and is home to the largest dam in the Caribbean. The Hatillo dam in the Yuna River is an example of a dam with flood control purposes. The Yuna continues past the dam running northeast while decreasing in elevation and receiving first the Maguaca River and later the Chacuey River along the right bank. The Yuna bypasses the city of Cotuí to the north and enters a Sánchez Ramírez region filled with cocoa orchards. The Camú River has its source within the Cordillera Central and has a watershed that spans seven provinces: La Vega, Santiago, Monseñor Nouel, Hermanas Mirabal, Sánchez Ramírez, and Duarte. The Yuna turns east after receiving the Camú River along its left bank and now serves as the Sánchez Ramírez-Duarte Province line, heading into wetlands filled with rice and cocoa cultivation. The easternmost segment of the Yuna past the mouth of the Camú River has the most s-shaped curves of any segment in its course.

The Yuna passes north of Los Haitises National Park where it meets the Cevicos River along its right bank. The Yuna then traverses a region with several lagoons and wetlands and heads north to the town of Villa Riva before turning southeast and receiving the Payabo River on its right bank. The Yuna next passes beneath Autopista Juan Pablo II upon briefly entering the municipality of Arenoso and continues east passing several small villages including Los Coles and Agua Santa del Yuna. The Yuna continues east into the village of Los Cacaos where the Yuna serves as the Duarte–Samaná Province line in a region filled with marshlands and cienegas. The main branch of the Yuna continues northeast receiving the Guayabo River on its left bank before traveling east into Samaná Province. The delta is located within the Lower Yuna Mangroves (Spanish: Manglares del Bajo Yuna) and empties into the Samaná Bay., which is one of the largest estuaries in the Caribbean. There is a long period when the Yuna River provides Samana Bay with a flow of stable and low freshwater, as well as two times of the year when the Yuna River rises and provides the Bay with a flow of large freshwater. In total the Yuna River, is 208 km long.

Rice irrigation
A primary usage for the Yuna River, where it travels along the city of Bonao, is for the cultivation of rice.

Noted by Barzman and Peguero (1995) in Impacts of Altered Freshwater Flows to Estuaries: Yuna River Watershed and Samana Bay (Jim Tobey, 2004) “agrochemical use for rice cultivation in the Yuna watershed is contributing to loss in soil fertility and to increases in pests, weeds, and diseases, which, in turn, require increases in the already high use of the same agrochemicals.” (Tobey, 2004, 31)

Geology
Although most of the Yuna River bed is vegetated, but there is a high amount of gravel south of Bonao.

References

Rivers of the Dominican Republic
Geography of Monseñor Nouel Province
Geography of Sánchez Ramírez Province
Geography of Samaná Province
Geography of Duarte Province